Harry Gardner (3 March 1878 – 16 February 1957) was an  Australian rules footballer who played with South Melbourne in the Victorian Football League (VFL).

Notes

External links 

1878 births
1957 deaths
Australian rules footballers from Victoria (Australia)
Sydney Swans players
South Yarra Football Club players